This is a list of Telugu-language films produced in the Tollywood in India that were released in the year 2020.

Box office collection 
The List of highest-grossing Tollywood films released in 2020, by worldwide box office gross revenue, are as follows:

January – March

April – June
Films were not released theatrically from 17 March 2020 due to the COVID-19 pandemic.

July – December

Events

Award ceremonies

References

External links

2020
Telugu

Tollywood
2020s in Indian cinema